The Grekov Odesa Art School (abbreviated ОХУ) is a secondary education institution in Odesa, Ukraine. It is the oldest arts school in the country.

History
The Grekov Odesa Art school was founded as a "drawing school" on May 30, 1865. Frederick Malman was its first principal. He drafted the rules of the school. It was an open Society of Fine Arts under the patronage of wealthy citizens of Odesa and the Russian Empire. Its patrons included S.M.Vorontsov, Governor-General Paul Demetrius von Kotzebue, Odesa's mayor N.A.Novoselsky, knyazes Gagarin, Manuc Bei, Tolstoy family, Italian General Consul Castile, as well as famous architects F.Boffo, O.I.Otton and F.V.Gonsiorovsky.

For twenty years, the school survived on donations and had no permanent address. The Vice President of Odesa Society of Fine Arts Franz Morandi became involved in its funding. The first plaster casts, prints, models were discharged to him from the Milan Academy of Fine Arts, with which he had good relations.

On May 22, 1883, outside Preobrazhenska str., the cornerstone of the art school was laid. In 1885 the school moved to its current premises. On December 30, 1899, the sponsor approved the charter and the state of the Art School. Grand Duke Vladimir Alexandrovich was a sponsor of the school for 25 years until he died in 1909. Until 1917, the Odesa Art School had the name of Grand Duke. In 1924 the school was renamed the Polytechnic College of Fine Arts, which prepared muralists, printers and potters. In 1930, Polytechnic College was renamed again to an Art Institute (high education), but in 1934 the Odesa Art Institute once again became a secondary education school.

In 1965, in honour of the school's 100th-anniversary, it was renamed for Mitrofan Grekov; one of its former pupils.

In 1993, the school caught fire, and an assembly hall and a library burned.

In 1997, the Cabinet of Ministers of Ukraine issued a decree "On improvement of higher vocational education." It was based on the former art school created by the Odesa Theatre and Art School, which presents separation: artistic, educational, theatrical and folk art.

Education
Today the Grekov Odesa Art school has a fine art focus with 4 departments: Paintings (живопис), Sculpture (скульптура), Art decoration environment (ceramics, batik) (художнє декорування середовища) and Design (artwork) (дизайн).

In 2015 the school had 259 students. They form groups from 6 to 10 people.

The course lasts 4 years of full time study.

Notable alumni

Nathan Altman 
Boris Anisfeld 
Joseph Barsky 
Isaak Brodsky
David Burliuk
Yakov Chernikhov
Stanisław Chlebowski
Lucien Dulfan
Samson Flexor
Vladimir Gorb
Wassily Kandinsky
Valentin Khrushch
Kyriak Kostandi
Sasha Krasny
Iosif Langbard 
Oksana Mas
Michael Matusevitch 
Lev Meshberg
Leonid Mezheritski
Pyotr Nilus
Amshey Nurenberg
Abel Pann
Leonid Pasternak
Vasyl Ponikarov
Aleksandr Razumny
Franz Roubaud
Vasiliy Ryabchenko
Yuri Salko
Sergey Savchenko
Nikolay Sednin
Iosif Shkolnik
Oleksii Shovkunenko
Alexander Stovbur
Stanislav I. Sychov
Alexander Telalim
Oksana Zhnikrup

References

External links
 website (in Ukrainian)
 the state at Marth 2015

1865 establishments in the Russian Empire
Educational institutions established in 1865
Education in Odesa
Art schools in Ukraine